Hidemitsu (written: 秀満 or 英光) is a masculine Japanese given name. Notable people with the name include:

, Japanese samurai
, Japanese general
, Japanese writer

Japanese masculine given names